Marco Delgado may refer to:

Marco Delgado (comics), fictional mutant supervillain in the Marvel Comics Universe
Mark Delgado (born 1995), American soccer player